The Brixia PM-5 is an Italian pump-action shotgun manufactured by Brixia Shotguns.

Shotgun, PM-5 rifle was developed by the Italian Company used by various police and military forces, including the French Navy. The PM-5 is almost unique in that it has a removable magazine, the magazine greatly improves the time and the balance of the charge. The Valtro PM-5 is available with either a fixed stock or a folding stock.
The power system PM-5 is conventional, manually operated. The tube under the barrel serves as a guide for scrolling. The loader 7 rounds, plus one in the chamber.

It is unusual in that it takes a detachable box magazine.  Both 7- and 10-round magazines have been manufactured, although the 7-round magazine is much more common.  
Renowned for their simplicity, lightweight and reliability, this pump action 12 GA shotgun has sold on the US market for as much as $1200.00.
Currently PM-5 model produced by Brixia Shotgun in Italy. A company that bought Valtro Brand after it declare bankruptcy.

In Canada, Brixia Shotguns and famous PM-5, distributed by Savminter Enterprises.

See also
Pump-action
Shotgun

External links 
 Modern Weapons—Valtro PM-5
 Brixia/Valtro PM-5

Shotguns of Italy
Pump-action shotguns